Aleksandr Dmitriyevich Tenyayev (born 11 March 1996) is a Russian football player. He plays for FC Tekstilshchik Ivanovo.

Club career
Tenyayev made his debut in the Russian Professional Football League for FC KAMAZ Naberezhnye Chelny on 28 July 2016 in a game against FC Volga Ulyanovsk.

Tenyayev made his Russian Football National League debut for FC Mordovia Saransk on 13 July 2019 in a game against FC Shinnik Yaroslavl.

On 9 August 2020, Tenyayev signed for Armenian Premier League club FC Van.

References

External links
 
 

1996 births
Living people
Russian footballers
Association football defenders
FC KAMAZ Naberezhnye Chelny players
FC Mordovia Saransk players
FC Zenit-Izhevsk players
FC Van players
FC Volga Ulyanovsk players
FC Tekstilshchik Ivanovo players
Russian First League players
Russian Second League players
Armenian Premier League players
Russian expatriate footballers
Expatriate footballers in Armenia